Jean Weber (25 January 1906 – 13 October 1995) was a French film actor.

Selected filmography
 The Queen's Necklace (1929)
 Figaro (1929)
 The Eaglet (1931)
 The Man at Midnight (1931)
 Take Care of Amelie (1932)
 Heartbeat (1938)
 Tricoche and Cacolet (1938)
 If Paris Were Told to Us (1956)

References

Bibliography
 Goble, Alan. The Complete Index to Literary Sources in Film. Walter de Gruyter, 1999.

External links

1906 births
1995 deaths
French male film actors
Male actors from Paris